Bandidos is a 1967 Spaghetti Western film. It marked the directorial debut of then-cinematographer Massimo Dallamano.

Synopsis 
Renowned gunman Richard Martin is travelling on a train which is held up by Billy Kane, a former student of Martin's. Kane spares Martin, but only after shooting his hands. Years later, Martin meets an escaped convict, wrongly convicted for the train robbery. Martin trains his new student and both men seek out Billy Kane.

Cast

Production
Bandidos was Massimo Dallamano's first film as a director. The film was produced by Solly V. Bianco, who had previously worked with Dallamano on Buffalo Bill, Hero of the Far West. The film was an Italian and Spanish co-production, between E.P.I.C. Film (Edizioni Produzioni Internazionali Cinematografic) in Rome and Hesperia Films in Madrid. The film was shot in both Italy and Spain, including near Madrid. In Lazio in Italy, Dallamano shot at the gorge in Tolfa and along the River Treja. Although Emilio Foriscot was the film's credited cinematographer, camera operator Sergio D'Offizi recalled that Dallamano lit and shot Bandidos entirely by himself.

Release
Bandidos was first released in October 1967 by Euro International. The film was released as Bandidos in most territories. It occasionally referred to as Crepa tu... che vivo io... but all promotional material for the film refers to it as Bandidos. The film was released in the United Kingdom by Butcher's Film Service. It was released on home video in the UK in the early 1980s by Fletcher Video. Arrow Video released the film alongside Massacre Time, My Name Is Pecos and And God Said to Cain as part of their Blu-ray box set Vengeance Trails: Four Classic Westerns on July 27, 2021.

Reception
From contemporary reviews, the Monthly Film Bulletin gave the film a brief review stating that Bandidos was "marked by some largely gratuitous violence and a strident soundtrack" and that "only the device of a playing card tied to a metronome to provide a moving target for marksmanship practise strikes a spark of originality."

See also
 List of Italian films of 1967

References

Sources

External links

 

1967 films
Spaghetti Western films
Films directed by Massimo Dallamano
1967 Western (genre) films
1967 directorial debut films
Films shot in Madrid
Films shot in Lazio
Revisionist Western (genre) films
1960s Italian films